The Dolores Doré Eccles Broadcast Center (often shortened to Eccles Broadcast Center) is headquarters of three broadcast stations and a statewide educational consortium. The center houses KUED, KUER, KUEN and the Utah Education Network. The facility is northeast of the Jon M. Huntsman Center and southwest of the Huntsman Cancer Institute on the University of Utah campus in Salt Lake City.

Renovation project
The facility started in 1993 with a $5.5 million gift from the George S. and Dolores Dore Eccles Foundation and included . An expansion, completed in 2001, added . The original structure cost $8.8 million. The cost of the expansion was $7.6 million according to an Open House brochure published December 7, 2001. Architect Dick Huss, AIA of Babcock Design Group planned the original structure and the addition. Okland Construction Company served as general contractor.

Produced at the Eccles Broadcast Center (partial list)
Aftermath of Meth (KUED)
Brigham Young (KUED)
Conversations with Ted Capener (KUED)
eMedia, College Media and Media Hub (UEN, Media Solutions, KUED)
NetSafe Utah (UEN & KUED)
Nighttime Jazz with Steve Williams (KUER)
Pioneer, Utah's Online Library (UEN)
Radio West (KUER)
The Governor's Monthly News Conference (KUED)
The Struggle for Statehood (KUED)
The Utah PTA Golden Apple Awards (KUED)
UEN SciFi Friday (UEN)
University of Utah Web Site (Media Solutions)
Utah World War II Stories (KUED)
VoteUtah Web site (KUED, UEN)
What's in a Song (Western Folklife Center for NPR)
Why the Cowboy Sings (Western Folklife Center & KUED)

See also 
 Spencer Eccles

References

External links 

 KUED-TV
 KUER-FM
 UEN-TV (KUEN)
 Utah Education Network
 Utah History Encyclopedia, hosted by the Utah Education Network
 Western Folklife Center

Buildings and structures at the University of Utah
University and college buildings completed in 1993
Mass media in Utah
1993 establishments in Utah